Fylde South was a constituency which returned one Member of Parliament (MP)  to the House of Commons of the Parliament of the United Kingdom from 1950, until it was abolished for the 1983 general election.

Boundaries 
The Borough of Lytham St Annes, the Urban District of Kirkham, the Rural District of Fylde, and part of the Rural District of Preston.

Members of Parliament

Elections

Elections in the 1950s

Elections in the 1960s

Elections in the 1970s

References 

Parliamentary constituencies in North West England (historic)
Constituencies of the Parliament of the United Kingdom established in 1950
Constituencies of the Parliament of the United Kingdom established in 1983
Borough of Fylde